Zoran Rankić (9 August 1935 – 9 December 2019) was a Serbian actor and writer. He was best known for the controversial role of Chetnik commander Nikola Kalabić in 1981 TV docudrama Poslednji čin and for the role of Žarko Popara in the TV show Srećni ljudi. He died in Belgrade, aged 84.

References

External links
 

Serbian male actors
1935 births
2019 deaths
People from Derventa
Serbs of Bosnia and Herzegovina